Zhenba County is a county under the administration and in the southeast corner of Hanzhong City, in the southwest of Shaanxi province, China. The southernmost county-level division of Hanzhong, it borders Sichuan province to the south.

Administrative divisions
As of 2020, Zhenba County is divided into 1 subdistrict and 19 towns.
Subdistricts
 

Towns

Climate

Transportation
China National Highway 210

References

 
County-level divisions of Shaanxi
Hanzhong